Dame Finola Mary Lucy O'Farrell DBE KC (born 15 December 1960), commonly called The Honourable Mrs Justice O'Farrell is a British high court judge and barrister.

Early life
Finola O'Farrell was educated at St Philomena's Catholic High School for Girls and later earned a bachelor's degree from Durham University in 1982.

Career
O'Farrell was called to the Bar in 1983 at the Inner Temple and practised construction and energy law. In 2002, she became a QC and was appointed as a Recorder in 2007. On 3 October 2016, she was appointed as a High Court judge and was appointed a Dame Commander of the Order of the British Empire in the same year. She is Judge in Charge of the Technology and Construction Court.

Personal life 
In 1993, she married Stuart Andrews with whom she has one daughter. He died in 2010.

References

1960 births
Living people
Dames Commander of the Order of the British Empire
Alumni of Trevelyan College, Durham
British women judges
English King's Counsel
British people of Irish descent
British Roman Catholics
Place of birth missing (living people)
Date of birth missing (living people)
21st-century King's Counsel
21st-century English judges